Alfredo William "Tito" Horford (born January 19, 1966) is a Dominican retired professional basketball player who was selected by the Milwaukee Bucks in the second round (39th overall) of the 1988 NBA draft. Horford played three years in the National Basketball Association (NBA), two with the Bucks from 1988–1990, and a short stint with the Washington Bullets during the 1993–94 season. He played in Spain in 1992.  He was listed on the Bucks' summer 1992 roster.

Early years
Tito Horford was born in La Romana, Dominican Republic. His father was a Bahamian immigrant. He attended Marian Christian High School (closed in 1989) in Houston which originally recruited him from the Dominican Republic. After high school, Horford enrolled at the University of Houston, when he was ruled ineligible. He then went to Louisiana State University before being kicked off the team. He then played at University of Miami.

Career

Drafted by the Milwaukee Bucks with the 39th pick of the 1988 NBA draft, Tito Horford became the first Dominican-born player to play in the NBA. He spent the 1988–89 and ’89–90 seasons with the Milwaukee Bucks and also had a three-game stint with the Washington Bullets. Horford then travelled the world to play basketball in France and Italy while also playing in the Dominican semi-pro leagues, as well as for the national team.

Career statistics

Regular season

|-
| align="left" | 1988–89
| align="left" | Milwaukee
| 25 || 0 || 4.5 || .326 || .000 || .632 || 0.9 || 0.1 || 0.0 || 0.3 || 1.7
|-
| align="left" | 1989–90
| align="left" | Milwaukee
| 35 || 0 || 6.7 || .290 || .000 || .625 || 1.7 || 0.1 || 0.1 || 0.5 || 1.5
|-
| align="left" | 1993–94
| align="left" | Washington
| 3 || 0 || 9.3 || .000 || .000 || .000 || 1.0 || 0.0 || 0.3 || 1.0 || 0.0
|- class="sortbottom"
| style="text-align:center;" colspan="2"| Career
| 63 || 0 || 6.0 || .300 || .000 || .628 || 1.3 || 0.1 || 0.1 || 0.4 || 1.5
|}

Playoffs

|-
| align="left" | 1989–90
| align="left" | Milwaukee
| 2 || 0 || 1.0 || 1.000 || .000 || .000 || 0.0 || 0.0 || 0.0 || 0.0 || 1.0
|}

Personal life
After retiring from basketball, he settled in Lansing, Michigan.

His son, Al Horford, went to the University of Florida and played a prominent role in the Gators team that won the national championship in 2006 and 2007. He  was selected 3rd overall by the Atlanta Hawks in the 2007 NBA draft, and went on to be a five-time All-Star during his career.

His other son, Jon Horford, played as a forward for the University of Michigan basketball team. He then transferred to Florida after his junior season.

His brother, Kelly Horford, played at Florida Atlantic University from 1992 to 1996.

References

External links
Tito Horford Statistics

1966 births
Living people
Centers (basketball)
Dominican Republic people of Bahamian descent
Esporte Clube Sírio basketball players
McDonald's High School All-Americans
Miami Hurricanes men's basketball players
Milwaukee Bucks draft picks
Milwaukee Bucks players
National Basketball Association players from the Dominican Republic
Parade High School All-Americans (boys' basketball)
People from La Romana, Dominican Republic
Washington Bullets players